Prunus brasiliensis is a species of tree in the family Rosaceae. It is native to Brazil and north-eastern Argentina.

Description 

Distribution and habitat 

References

External links 
 Prunus brasiliensis. Photos

brasiliensis
Trees of Brazil
Trees of Argentina